"Think Vulgar" is a song created especially for the stage musical production of Chitty Chitty Bang Bang. It was written by Robert and Richard Sherman in 2001 and premiered at the London Palladium on April 16, 2002. It was subsequently replaced by "Act English" a year later.  The song is sung in a private moment when the Vulgarian spies determine their strategy of deceit by which they will obtain possession of Caractacus Potts' invention, the car, Chitty Chitty Bang Bang.

About the song
After March 15, 2003, "Think Vulgar" was not performed any more. However, the song can still be found on the Original London Cast Album which was recorded in June 2002.
Songwriter, Robert Sherman, agreed to write the replacement song, "Act English", but only under protest. He felt that "Think Vulgar" better suited the Vulgarian Spies' personalities. Also, Sherman believed that "Act English" would not be immediately accessible to American audiences.

Why the song was replaced
The concept for "Act English" was conceived by book writer Jeremy Sams and director Adrian Noble who felt that "Think Vulgar" was not moving the story along at a quick enough pace. Although there were creative differences among the parties, the parties remained friendly.

2002 songs
Songs from Chitty Chitty Bang Bang
Songs written by the Sherman Brothers